The Doe Boy is a 2001 independent drama film written and directed by Randy Redroad.  It was selected as the United States winner of the Sundance Film Festival/NHK International Filmmakers Award in 2000.  The Doe Boy was produced by filmmaker, Chris Eyre.

Plot
Set in 1984 in the heart of the Cherokee Nation of Oklahoma, The Doe Boy tells the coming of age story of Hunter (James Duval), a young man of mixed heritage who is also a haemophiliac.

Cast
 James Duval as Hunter
 Kevin Anderson as Hank Kirk
 Jeri Arredondo as Maggie Kirk
 Andrew J. Ferchland as Young Hunter
 Gordon Tootoosis as Marvin Fishinghawk
 Jude Herrera as Geri 
 Jim Metzler as Dr. Moore
 Nathaniel Arcand as Junior
 Robert A. Guthrie as Cheekie
 Gil Birmingham as Manny 
 Alex Rice as Bird
 Orvel Baldridge as Oliver
 Kyle White as Young Junior

Awards and nominations
 Sundance/NHK International Filmmaker's Award 
 Taos Talking Pictures - Best First Time Director
 Wine Country Film Festival - Best First Feature, Best Actor (James Duval)
 Great Plains Film Festival - Best Feature
 Deauville American Film Festival 2001 - Official Competition
 IFP/Gotham Open Palm Award - Outstanding Directorial Debut - Finalist
 Perrier Bubbling Under Award - Finalist
 Galway Film Fleadh - Best First Time Director Co-Winner 
 First Nations Film Festival, Montreal - Grand Prize
 Great Plains Film Festival - Best Feature
 Empire State Film Festival  - Grand Prize
 Route 66 Film Festival, Chicago Best Feature With Diversity Emphasis
 American Indian Film Festival - Best Film, Best Director, Best Actor (James Duval), Best Actress (Jeri Arredondo) Best Supporting Actress (Jude Herrera)

References

External links
 
 
 

2001 films
2001 drama films
American independent films
Cherokee in popular culture
Films set in the 1980s
Films set in Oklahoma
Films about Native Americans
Films by indigenous directors
Films set in 1984
American drama films
2001 independent films
2000s English-language films
2000s American films